Frimley Green Windmill is a Grade II listed tower mill at Frimley Green, Surrey, England, which has been converted to residential use.

History
Frimley Green Windmill was first mentioned in 1784 in the ownership of a Mr Terry. It passed to Thomas Lilley in 1792 and then William Collins in 1801. In 1803, the mill passed into the ownership of the Royal Military College, Sandhurst, remaining in the hands of the military until at least 1832 and probably much later than that. The mill was disused by 1870, and the derelict shell was converted to residential use in 1914.

Description

Frimley Green Windmill is a four-storey brick tower mill. Little is known of the mill, although it had at least one pair of Spring or Patent sails.

Millers
George Marshall 1792
John Banks 1801

Reference for above:-

References

External links
Windmill World webpage on Frimley Green Windmill.

Windmills in Surrey
Tower mills in the United Kingdom
Grade II listed buildings in Surrey
Grinding mills in the United Kingdom
Grade II listed windmills
Frimley Green